Zvartnots-AAL Football Club, is a defunct Armenian football club, from the capital Yerevan, represented the Armenian Airlines.

History
The club was founded on February, 1997 by the Armenian Airlines, the state-owned flag carrier of Armenia. It made its debut in Armenian football in the 1997 Armenian First League, where they finished on 8th position. The team produced its first notable result in the 1998 Armenian First League, where it became the league's champions and won promotion to the Armenian Premier League. In a few years Zvartnots-AAL would become one of the main contenders to the Premier League title. In their first Premier League season they reached the fourth spot, while in 2001 they became second after FC Pyunik. In the 2003 season they would still be among the Premier League clubs, however they withdrew before the season began and disbanded. They have been inactive ever since.

Zvartnots-AAL in European cups
As of July, 2009.

Home results are noted in bold

References
RSSSF Armenia (and subpages per year)

External links
 Official website

Association football clubs established in 1997
Association football clubs disestablished in 2003
Zvartnots
1997 establishments in Armenia
2003 disestablishments in Armenia